Bendable may refer to:

 Articulation (disambiguation)
 Bendable concrete
 Bendable LED

See also
 
 
 Bend (disambiguation)